Natasha Sharma Redij is an Indian actress who mainly work in Hindi television. She made her acting debut in 2009 and is best known for her portrayal of Sia Sangwan in Na Aana Is Des Laado. She also participate in Comedy Circus Ke SuperStars in 2010 and portrayed Vasundhara in Yahan Main Ghar Ghar Kheli.

Personal life
Sharma got engaged to her boyfriend actor Aditya Redij on 29 April 2012. They got married in 2014. The duo welcomed their first child, a son in October 2022.

Career
Sharma made her acting debut with Na Aana Is Des Laado portraying Sia Sangwan opposite Aditya Redij from 2009 to 2010. It proved as a major turning point in her career. She received Indian Telly Award for Best Actress in a Lead Role nomination for her performance.

She appeared as a Contestant on Comedy Circus Ke SuperStars with Kapil Sharma and also appeared in an episode of Aahat, both in 2010. In 2011, she made her Hindi film debut with Luv Ka The End portraying BBC Website.

Sharma portrayed Vasundhara in Yahan Main Ghar Ghar Kheli in 2012. The same year, she appeared in an episode of Lakhon Mein Ek as Shilpa. She also hosted BIG Memsaab with Manish Goel in 2012.

In 2015, she portrayed a News Reporter in her Punjabi film debut Sardaar Ji.

Filmography

Films

Television

Awards and nominations

See also
List of Hindi television actresses

References

External links

Living people
Year of birth missing (living people)
Place of birth missing (living people)
Indian television actresses
Indian soap opera actresses